Lindsay Bartlett-Montero (born July 31, 1962) is an American former professional tennis player.

Biography
Bartlett, who grew up in California, played college tennis at the University of Oregon from 1981 to 1984 and amassed a 59-11 singles record.

As a professional player she reached a best singles ranking of 175 in the world. At the 1988 Australian Open she made the main draw as a qualifier and won through to the second round with a win over Kim Steinmetz. She was ranked as high as 91 in doubles, with her best performance on the WTA Tour a runner-up finish at the 1988 Cincinnati Open.

Her younger sister Shelly also played on the professional tour.

WTA Tour finals

Doubles (0–1)

References

External links
 
 

1962 births
Living people
American female tennis players
Oregon Ducks women's tennis players
Tennis people from California